Fares Mohammed Manaa (born February 8, 1965) is a top Yemeni arms-dealer, businessman, rebel commander and politician. He is said to be Yemen's most famous arms-dealer. Manaa was born on February 8, 1965, in the northern city of Saada. He was an ally of Yemeni President Ali Abdullah Saleh and member of his ruling GPC party and served as head of his presidential committee and as head of a local council tasked with mediating a peace-deal between the Yemeni government and Houthis during the Shia insurgency in Yemen. His brother was the governor of Saada Governorate at the time.

His name was put on a UN Security Council list of people accused of trafficking arms to Somali Islamist insurgent group Al-Shabaab, which is considered as a terrorist organisation by the United States and is accused of with al-Qaeda. This led to his assets being frozen by the U.S. Department of the Treasury. He was also accused of receiving millions in funds from the then Libyan ruler Muammar Gaddafi, spying for Libya and supplying arms to the Houthis. Manaa denied these charges claiming that arms had been stolen by Houthis from an arms deposit he owned. In October 2009 was put at the top of a blacklist of Yemeni arms-dealers, after which he was put under surveillance.

In late January 2010, Manaa was arrested by Yemeni authorities leading to protests in Sa'dah by tribal chiefs and the resignation of his brother, Hassan Manaa, as governor. In May, a mini-bus driver was killed and a policeman and a civilian woman were injured as a group of Manaa's men attacked the car in which he was being transported to a penal court. This resulted in his trial being delayed by 25 days. He was eventually released on June 4, after which his relations with President Saleh soured.

On March 19, Houthis attacked the city of Sa'dah, starting a battle with pro-government al-Abdin tribesmen, led by Yemeni lawmaker Sheikh Othman Majali. During the battle, rebels joined forces with Fares Manaa and after their victory, set up a local committee, composed of rebels, residents and defected military commanders, which appointed him as the new governor of Sa'dah on 26 March, after the pro-Saleh governor Taha Hajer fled to the capital Sanaa. He led the Houthis independent administration in Saada governorate until December 2014.

References

1965 births
Arms traders
Yemeni Zaydis
Yemeni rebels
Living people
Houthi members
People from Saada Governorate